The Road to Paradise (French: Le chemin du paradis) is a 1930 musical comedy film directed by Wilhelm Thiele and Max de Vaucorbeil and starring Lilian Harvey, Henri Garat and René Lefèvre. It was made by the German studio UFA as the French-language version of the hit film The Three from the Filling Station.

Cast
 Lilian Harvey as Liliane Bourcart  
 Henri Garat as Willy  
 René Lefèvre as Jean 
 Jacques Maury as Guy 
 Gaston Jacquet as Monsieur Bourcart 
 Olga Tschechowa as Edith de Tourkoff  
 Hubert Daix as Maitre Dupont-Belleville 
 Jean Boyer as L'huissier 
 Lewis Ruth as Orchestra Leader / Himself 
 Comedian Harmonists as Themselves

References

Bibliography
 O'Brien, Charles. Cinema's Conversion to Sound: Technology and Film Style in France and the U.S.. Indiana University Press,  2005.

External links 
 

1930 films
German musical comedy films
1930 musical comedy films
1930s French-language films
Films directed by Wilhelm Thiele
UFA GmbH films
German multilingual films
Films with screenplays by Franz Schulz
German black-and-white films
1930 multilingual films
1930s German films